"Bobby Brown (Goes Down)" is a song by Frank Zappa released on his album Sheik Yerbouti in 1979. One of his best known songs, it was hugely successful in Europe. It was a number-one-hit in Norway and Sweden and placed at number 4 in the German charts, where it sold more than 250,000 units. This song was more successful in Europe than the United States (the song's pervasive sexual content made it unfit for broadcast on U.S. radio) and this is why it is only featured on the vinyl and European CD version of Zappa's best of compilation, Strictly Commercial.

Synopsis
The song describes a wealthy, misogynistic student named Bobby Brown, "the cutest boy in town", whose life is the archetypal American Dream until a traumatic sexual encounter with "Freddie", a dyke involved in the women's liberation movement, leaves him questioning his sexuality. Bobby transforms into a leisure suit-wearing closeted homosexual working in radio promotions; by the end of the song, he and "a friend" (later implied to be his boss, as he will "do anything to get ahead", which also has a double meaning, i.e. getting head) have become self-described "sexual spastic(s)" involved in golden showers and S&M, for which he thanks Freddie.

Track listing
Version 1:

A."Bobby Brown" – 2:43
B."Baby Snakes" – 1:50

Version 2:

A."Bobby Brown" – 2:43
B."Stick It Out" – 4:33

Chart positions

Weekly charts

Year-end charts

Decade-end charts

Certifications

References

Frank Zappa songs
1979 songs
1979 singles
Songs written by Frank Zappa
LGBT-related songs
Songs about BDSM
Number-one singles in Sweden
Number-one singles in Norway
Song recordings produced by Frank Zappa
Satirical songs
CBS Records singles